Quarrie is the surname of the following people:
Bruce Quarrie (1947–2004), English writer
Don Quarrie (born 1951), Jamaican sprinter
George Quarrie (1846–1926), Manx poet
Kate Quarrie, Canadian politician

See also
McQuarrie
MacQuarrie

English-language surnames